The Reverend Thomas William Leventhorpe (1813 – 12 August 1860) was an English cleric and cricketer.

Life
The son of Thomas Leventhorpe and Mary Collett, Leventhorpe was educated at Winchester College, before attending Jesus College, Cambridge.

While studying at Cambridge, Leventhorpe made a single appearance in first-class cricket for Cambridge University against the Marylebone Cricket Club at Parker's Piece in 1835. In a match which the Marylebone Cricket Club won by 88 runs, he was dismissed for a duck twice, firstly by Charles Parnther in Cambridge University's first-innings, and then by John Bayley in their second-innings. Leventhorpe's batting style is unknown.

After leaving Jesus College in 1839, Leventhorpe became the parish priest of a number of churches in Cambridgeshire and Huntingdonshire. He died at Yelling, Huntingdonshire on 12 August 1860.

Family
The American Civil War Confederate general Collett Leventhorpe was Leventhorpe's brother.

In 1845, Leventhorpe married Louisa Rooper, daughter of John Bonfoy Rooper. Rooper Leventhorpe (1850–1940) was their son.

References

External links
Thomas Leventhorpe at ESPNcricinfo
Thomas Leventhorpe at CricketArchive

1813 births
1860 deaths
Cricketers from Greater London
People educated at Winchester College
Alumni of Jesus College, Cambridge
English cricketers
Cambridge University cricketers
19th-century English Anglican priests
People from Yelling